Layard's warbler (Curruca layardi) or Layard's tit-babbler, is a species of Old World warbler in the family Sylviidae. It is found in Lesotho, Namibia, and South Africa. Its natural habitat is subtropical or tropical dry shrubland.

References

External links
 Layard's warbler - Species text in The Atlas of Southern African Birds.

Layard's warbler
Birds of Southern Africa
Layard's warbler
Taxonomy articles created by Polbot